Matías Nahuel Leiva Esquivel (born 22 November 1996), known as Nahuel, is a professional footballer who plays as a right winger for Polish club Śląsk Wrocław. Born in Argentina, he has represented Spain at youth levels.

Club career

Villarreal
Born in Rosario, Santa Fe, Argentina, Nahuel moved to Spain at only 14, joining Villarreal CF's youth setup. He made his senior debut with the C-side in 2012–13, in Tercera División, and also appeared occasionally for the reserves during that first season.

Nahuel made his first-team – and La Liga – debut on 13 January 2014, playing 23 minutes in a 5–1 home routing of Real Sociedad. On 28 August he scored his first professional goal, netting the last in a 4–0 home win against FC Astana for the campaign's UEFA Europa League.

On 16 June 2016, Nahuel signed a two-year loan contract with Real Betis also of the top tier. On 30 January 2018, he was loaned to Segunda División team FC Barcelona B for six months.

Olympiacos
On 31 August 2018, the last day of the summer transfer window, Olympiacos F.C. signed Nahuel for an undisclosed fee – Villarreal retained a buyback option on the player. The following 31 January, after being rarely used, he returned to Spain after agreeing to a six-month loan deal with Deportivo de La Coruña of the second division.

Tenerife
On 30 August 2019, Nahuel joined CD Tenerife on a three-year contract. On 15 September, after scoring only one goal during the entire 2019–20 campaign, he was loaned to fellow second division side Real Oviedo, for one year.

Śląsk Wrocław
On 9 July 2022, Nahuel moved to Ekstraklasa club Śląsk Wrocław, signing a two-year deal.

International career
Nahuel was part of the Spain under-19 team which won the 2015 UEFA European Championship in Greece. He scored in a 3–0 group stage opening victory against holders Germany, adding the second goal in the 2–0 win over Russia in the decisive match in Katerini.

Honours
Spain U19
UEFA European Under-19 Championship: 2015

References

External links
Villarreal official profile 

La Liga official profile 

1996 births
Living people
Footballers from Rosario, Santa Fe
Spanish people of Argentine descent
Argentine footballers
Spanish footballers
Association football wingers
La Liga players
Segunda División players
Segunda División B players
Tercera División players
Super League Greece players
Villarreal CF C players
Villarreal CF B players
Villarreal CF players
Real Betis players
FC Barcelona Atlètic players
Deportivo de La Coruña players
CD Tenerife players
Real Oviedo players
Olympiacos F.C. players
Śląsk Wrocław players
Spain youth international footballers
Spain under-21 international footballers
Argentine expatriate footballers
Expatriate footballers in Greece
Expatriate footballers in Poland
Spanish expatriate sportspeople in Greece
Spanish expatriate sportspeople in Poland